Tanambao Vahatrakaka is a rural municipality located in the Atsinanana region of eastern Madagascar, and belongs to the Vatomandry (district).

References

Populated places in Atsinanana